Once Lobos Chalchuapa, commonly known as Once Lobos (the Eleven Wolves), is a professional Salvadoran football club based in Chalchuapa, Santa Ana, El Salvador.

Created in February 1918, Once Lobos are the oldest club still active in any form of the El Salvador football league system. They have been competing in the Segunda División de El Salvador (Segunda División) since 2005.

History

Once Lobos was founded in 1918, in Chalchuapa. Their first match that yearlong before the country had a football league or even a football federationwas against Fuerte 22, a club from nearby Santa Ana. The Club came about after the fusion of clubs Esparta and Germania.
Once Lobos played their first official match against UCA in 1923.

For many decades, the team played its home games at Estadio el Progreso, a pitch within earshot of the ancient Tazumal pyramid and its ballcourt from Pre-Columbian times. In December 2002, Once Lobos moved to the Estadio Cesar Hernández, in the outskirts of the city.

Once Lobos made its first ascension to the Primera División de Fútbol de El Salvador (La Primera) on February 7, 1980 at the Óscar Quiteño stadium in the neighboring city of Santa Ana, where they beat UCA in the second and decisive game. During their first full season in La Primera, struggled to fight-off relegation, made more difficult by the league's decision the previous year to relegate two teams at season's end. They finished 9th, staying ahead of Dragón and Platense, to maintain a spot in La Primera for the 1981 season.

In the 1981 Season, the Chalchuapa side won the "Torneo de Copa" by beating the League Champion Atlético Marte by penalties. At the conclusion of the regulation time, the score was tied one all (Once Lobos scorer was W. Barrera at 27‘) and nothing changed in the ensuing 30-minute overtime.

The 1982 season saw the team come under the direction of Dr. Ricardo Mena Laguán. At the end of the regular season, the teams that made it onto the final Serires were Águila, Atlético Marte, Independiente and Once Lobos. In this elimination round, Atlético Marte defeated Once Lobos 2 nil in the first leg and drawing in the second leg. Once Lobos and Águila fought for 3rd and 4th place respectively in a single game played on December 19. Once Lobos emerged victorious by Penalties after the end of regulation the score read 3 all. Once Lobos capitalized on all 5 shots while Águila could only score 4. Thus achieving the best position for the "yuqueros" in their long history.
To make this achievement more impressive, Once Lobos did it with only 10 men on the pitch since the 81st minute in regular time, when Mario D. Campos was sent off.

In their last season at the top level in this period, 1983, Once Lobos made it to the final round once again. Still under the direction of Ricardo Mena Laguán. Joined by Independiente, C.D. FAS and C.D. Águila fought the final in a two-round robin elimination; achieving 3rd place once again by defeating Independiente this time in the last game by a score of 2–1.

After a later relegation to the third division, Once Lobos were promoted to the Segunda División in 1995. They were promoted to La Primera in 2004 through a "play-off" game victory against Chalatenango.

In 2018, Once Lobos celebrated their 100th year of existence, receiving a special recognition from the Legislative Assembly of El Salvador as the oldest football club still in existence in the nation.

Honours
Once Lobos's first trophy was the Copa Campeons Tourney, which they won  in 1981. Their first league honour came in 1980–1981, when they won the 1980–81 Segunda División title

Once Lobos's honours include the following:

Domestic honours

Leagues
Primera División de Fútbol de El Salvador
 Third place (2): 1982, 1983
 Segunda División Salvadorean and predecessors 
 Champions: (3): 1980-81, 1996–97, 2014 Clausura

Cups
 Copa Champions Tourney: and predecessors 
 Champions (1): 1981

Colours and crest

Throughout the club's history, Once Lobos have worn blue with a yellow stripe.

Stadium
 Estadio de Chalchuapa, (2002–present)
 Estadio El Progreso, (1918–2002)
 Estadio César Hernández, (2004–2011) games played while renovations are being done at Estadio de Chalchuapa.

The 2,000-capacity Estadio de Chalchuapa has been Once Lobos's home stadium since its creation 2002. Previously the team played at Estadio El Progreso, where they had played their home matches from 1918 until the end of the 2001 season. The stadium was located in Santa Ana. The team's headquarters are located in TBD. 

In 2012, Estadio El Progreso was remodelled by INDES and Municipality of Chalchuapa for a cost of 39,000 dollars .

Records

Club Records
 First Match (prior to creation of a league): vs. Fuerte 22 (a club from Santa Ana), 1918
 First Match (official): vs. UCA, 1923
 Most points in La Primera: 41 points (13 win, 15 draws, 5 losses) 1986/87
 Least points in La Primera: 11 points (1 win, 8 draws, 27 losses) 1996/97

Individual records
 Most capped player for El Salvador: 50 (0 whilst at Once Lobos), Luis Guevara Mora
 Most international caps for El Salvador while a Once Lobos player: 1, TBD
 Most goals in a season, all competitions: unknown player, 62 (1927/28) (47 in League, 15 in Cup competitions)
 Most goals in a season, La Primera: TBD, 7

Overall seasons table in La Primera
{|class="wikitable"
|-bgcolor="#efefef"
!  Pos.
! Club
! Season In La Primera
! Pl.
! W
! D
! L
! GS
! GA
! Dif.
|-
|align=center bgcolor=|TBA
|Once Lobos
|align=center |11
|align=center|310
|align=center|77
|align=center|108
|align=center|125
|align=center|340
|align=center|439
|align=center|-99
|}

Last updated: 11 March 2018

Current squad
As of October 2022:

Squad changes
In:

Out:

List of Coaches
The club's current manager is the Salvadorian Nelson Mauricio Ancheta. There have been TBD permanent and TBD caretaker managers of Once Lobos since the appointment of the club's first professional manager, Ranulfo Castro in 1922. The club's longest-serving manager, in terms of both length of tenure and number of games overseen, is TBD, who managed the club between 1996 and 2018. Argentinian Raul Miralles was Once Lobos's first manager from outside the El Salvador. Salvadoran Ricardo Mena Laguán helped Once Lobos reached its highest possible finish in Primera division with a 3rd place finish in 1982.
Miguel Angel Deras "Chincullita", Cesar "El Piscuchita" Acevedo and Mauricio Laureano Alvarenga "Tarzan"  is the club's most successful coach in terms of titles, having won one Segunda División Salvadorean title.

List of notable players
Players with senior international caps
  Byron Pérez
  Óscar Enrique Sánchez
  Luis Guevara Mora
  Jose Luis Rugamas

Team captains

References

External links
Web Oficial Once lobos – Official website
El Grafico Profile 

Football clubs in El Salvador
Association football clubs established in 1922
1922 establishments in El Salvador